Basilewskyana villiersi is a species of beetle in the family Carabidae, the only species in the genus Basilewskyana.

References

Scaritinae